Nathalie Fortain (born 12 July 1969) is a French racewalker. She competed in the women's 10 kilometres walk at the 1996 Summer Olympics.

References

1969 births
Living people
Athletes (track and field) at the 1996 Summer Olympics
French female racewalkers
Olympic athletes of France
Place of birth missing (living people)